The Guatemalan Armed Forces consists of the National Army of Guatemala (Ejercito Nacional de Guatemala, ENG), the Guatemalan National Defense Navy (Marina de la Defensa Nacional, includes Marines), the Guatemalan Air Force (Fuerza Aerea Guatemalteca, FAG), and the Presidential Honor Guard (Guardia de Honor Presidencial).

The Ministry of National Defence is the agency of the Guatemalan government responsible for the budget, training and policy of the armed forces. Based in Guatemala City, the Defence Ministry is heavily guarded, and the President of Guatemala frequently visits.   the Minister of National Defence is Major General Luis Miguel Ralda Moreno.

The Minister of Defense is responsible for policy. Day-to-day operations are the responsibility of the military chief of staff and the national defense staff.

History

Guatemala is a signatory to the Rio Pact and was a member of the Central American Defense Council (CONDECA). The President of the Republic is commander-in-chief.

Prior to 1945 the Defence Ministry was titled the Secretariat of War (Secretaría de la Guerra).

An agreement signed in September 1996, which is one of the substantive peace accords, mandated that the mission of the armed forces change to focus exclusively on external threats. Presidents Álvaro Arzú and his successors Alfonso Portillo, Óscar Berger and Álvaro Colom, have used a constitutional clause to order the army on a temporary basis to support the police in response to a nationwide wave of violent crime, a product of the Mexican criminal organizations going across the north-west region.

The peace accords call for a one-third reduction in the army's authorized strength and budget — achieved in 2004 — and for a constitutional amendment to permit the appointment of a civilian minister of defense. A constitutional amendment to this end was defeated as part of a May 1999 plebiscite, but discussions between the executive and legislative branches continue on how to achieve this objective.

In 2004 the army has gone beyond its accord-mandated target, and has implemented troop reductions from an estimated 28,000 to 15,500 troops, including subordinate air force (1,000) and navy (1,000) elements. It is equipped with armaments and material from the United States, Israel, Taiwan, Argentina, Spain, and France. As part of the army downsizing, the operational structure of 19 military zones and three strategic brigades are being recast as several military zones are eliminated and their area of operations absorbed by others. The air force operates three air bases; the navy has two port bases.

The Guatemalan army has a special forces unit (specializing in anti-insurgent jungle warfare) known as the Kaibiles. In 2011, a Guatemalan court convicted four members of the Kaibiles, of killing more than 200 civilians in the Dos Erres massacre in 1982. Each man was sentenced to 6,050 years in prison. Their convictions for their roles in the massacre nearly 30 years prior, in which soldiers killed more than 200 men, women, and children, would not have happened if not for the courage of victims of violence and Guatemala's attorney general, Claudia Paz y Paz. After the convictions of the Dos Erres four, based on a Guatemalan government's commitment to reorganize its special forces units, the U.S. Department of Defense resumed military aid.

Armed Forces Day
The Día del Ejército (Army Day or Armed Forces Day) is celebrated on 30 June, although if it occurs on a Tuesday or Wednesday it is celebrated on the prior Monday, and if it occurs on Thursday, Friday, Saturday, or Sunday it moves to the following Monday.

Organization
The Armed Forces today number at around 39,000 active personnel.

Leadership

Service branches

Army
The Army or Land Forces are the oldest military branch of the armed forces. In the middle of the 19th century, General Rafael Carrera promoted it with the triumph in the Battle of San José La Arada, dated to 2 February 1851, a date that is today commemorated as the day of this branch.

Navy
The Navy was founded on 15 January 1959, by the then President Miguel Ydígoras Fuentes, due to the need to protect the country's marine resources, which at the time were the object of illegal predation by fishing boats from neighboring countries. It is a state entity with functions as a police agency for seas and rivers.

Air Force

The Guatemalan Air Force constitutes the aviation portion of the Guatemalan Army. Founded in 1921, it is organized, equipped and trained to plan, conduct and execute the actions imposed by the State Military Defense in relation to the use of air power.

Honor Guard
The Presidential Honor Guard of Guatemala is a branch of the Guatemalan Land Forces, responsible for the care and protection of the President of the Republic, as well as the Vice President.

Equipment

Personal equipment

Vehicles
All data from World Military Intelligence

Armoured vehicles

Utility vehicles

Artillery

Towed artillery
12 M-101 105mm (United States)
8 M-102 105mm (United States)
56 M-56 105mm (Yugoslavia)
12 M-116 75mm (United States)

Mortars
55 M-1 81mm (United States)
12 M30 107mm (United States)
18 ECIA 120mm (Spain)

Recoilless rifles
64 M67 90mm recoilless rifles (United States)
64 M-1974 FMK-1 105mm recoilless rifles (Argentina)
56 M40A1 106mm recoilless rifles (United States)

Air defence
16 M-55 3x20mm (Yugoslavia)
16 GAI-BO1 20mm Oerlikon (Switzerland)
TCM 20 2x20mm (some reported) (Israel/Switzerland)
5 M42 Duster 2x40mm SP-AAG (United States/Sweden)

Naval boats
1 110 ft Broad class patrol boat: GC-1051
1 40 ft Dauntless class patrol boat: Iximche
2 85 ft Sewart Seacraft patrol boats: GC-851 Utatlan, GC-852 Subteniente Osoho Saravia
6 Cutlass 65 ft (Halter Marine) class patrol boats: GC 651-656
11 small patrol launches
1 ferry
2 sail training boats
2 Machete class personnel landing craft (Halter Marine)

Notable military personnel
 Captain General Rafael Carrera 
 Colonel Jacobo Árbenz Guzman 
 Field Marshal José Víctor Zavala
 General Justo Rufino Barrios
 General Miguel Garcia Granados

References

External links 
 Official Website of Guatemala's Military
 
 Raul Sohr. ‘’Centroamérica en guerra.’’ Alianza Editorial. México. 1988.
 Christopher F. Foss. ‘’Jane's tank and combat vehicles recognition guide. ‘’Harper Collins Publishers. UK. 2000.